Rok Tičar (born 3 May 1989) is a Slovenian ice hockey player who is currently playing for Klagenfurt Athletic Sports Club in the ICE Hockey League. He has participated in several IIHF World Championships as a member of the Slovenia men's national ice hockey team, and is a member as of 2021. Tičar has previously played with IK Oskarshamn in the Swedish Hockey League (SHL), and with German club Krefeld Pinguine.

Career statistics

Regular season and playoffs

International

References

External links

1989 births
Living people
HK Acroni Jesenice players
Avtomobilist Yekaterinburg players
Ice hockey players at the 2014 Winter Olympics
Ice hockey players at the 2018 Winter Olympics
Kölner Haie players
Krefeld Pinguine players
HC Kunlun Red Star players
Olympic ice hockey players of Slovenia
IK Oskarshamn players
HC Sibir Novosibirsk players
HC Slovan Bratislava players
Slovenian ice hockey centres
Slovenian expatriate sportspeople in Sweden
Slovenian expatriate sportspeople in Germany
Slovenian expatriate sportspeople in Slovakia
Slovenian expatriate sportspeople in Russia
Sportspeople from Jesenice, Jesenice
Timrå IK players
Torpedo Nizhny Novgorod players
EC KAC players
Slovenian expatriate sportspeople in Austria
Slovenian expatriate sportspeople in China
Slovenian expatriate ice hockey people
Expatriate ice hockey players in China
Expatriate ice hockey players in Russia
Expatriate ice hockey players in Germany
Expatriate ice hockey players in Austria
Expatriate ice hockey players in Slovakia
Expatriate ice hockey players in Sweden